Cymatozus polymorphomyiodes is a species of ulidiid or picture-winged fly in the genus Cymatozus of the family Ulidiidae.

References

Ulidiidae